Hakop ( in Eastern Armenian, pronounced hakob or  in Western Armenian, pronounced hagop is a common Armenian first name. In the United States, a common English version is Jack.

It has been used in Armenian since pre-Christian times.

Its diminutive form is also common in the Armenian: Hakopik ( or ). It is sometimes used as a last name as well, by adding the "ian" suffix: Hagopian ( or ).

Notable people named Agop
Agop Dilaçar (or Hagop Martayan) (1895–1979), Armenian-Turkish linguist and the head specialist of the Turkish Language Association between 1942-1979.
Agop Jack Hacikyan (born 1931), Canadian-Armenian university Professor of Literary Studies, historian, academic and writer.
Agop Terzan (1927–2020), Armenian-French astronomer

Surname
Rolf Agop (1908–1998), German conductor and academic
Güllü Agop (1840–1902), Ottoman Armenian theatre director
Adolphus Agopsowicz, (1932-2005) Canadian stage name John Vernon

Notable people named Hagop
Hagop S. Akiskal, Armenian-American psychiatrist
Hagop Avesyan (born 1988), Armenian footballer
Hagop Baronian (1843–1891), influential Ottoman Armenian writer, satirist, educator, and social figure in the 19th century
Hagop Barsoumian (born 1936), Armenian scholar and Armenology professor. Abducted in 1986, body never found
Hagop Chirishian (born 1989), American soccer player of Armenian origin
Hagop Der Hagopian, real name of Shahan Natalie, Armenian writer and revolutionary, and member of the Armenian Revolutionary Federation
Hagop Goudsouzian, Armenian-Canadian film director known for film My Son Shall Be Armenian
Hagop Hagopian (or Agop Agopian) (1951–1988), founder and main leader of the Armenian Secret Army for the Liberation of Armenia (ASALA)
Hakob Melik Hakobian, real name of famous Armenian novelist Raffi
Hagop Kassarjian (born 1946),  Lebanese-Armenian politician, MP and minister
Hagop Kazazian Pasha (1833–1891), high-ranking Ottoman official of Armenian origin who served as the Minister of Finance and the Minister of the Privy Treasury during the reign of Sultan Abdul Hamid II
Hagop Kevorkian, (1872-1962), Armenian-American archeologist, connoisseur of art, collector
Hagop Oshagan (or Hakob Oshakan) (1883-1948), Armenian novelist, short story writer, playwright, and literary critic
Hagop Pakradounian, Lebanese-Armenian politician, MP
Hagop Sandaldjian (1931–1990), Egyptian-born Armenian American musician and microminiature sculptor

Surname
Anton Hagop, Australian music producer / engineer

Notable people named Hakob
Hakob Arshakyan (born 1985), Armenian politician
Hakob Gyurjian (1881–1948), Armenian sculptor
Hakob Hakobian (painter) (born 1923), modern Armenian painter
Hakob Hakobian (poet) (1866–1937), Soviet Armenian poet, the founder of Armenian proletary poesia
Hakob Kojoyan (1883–1959), Armenian artist
Hakob Meghapart, first Armenian printer, the founder of the Armenian printing
Hakob Sanasaryan (born c.1950), Armenian environmentalist campaigner and chemist
Hakob Zavriev, Armenian politician

See also
Hakobyan (including variants)
L'École Arménienne Sourp Hagop, Armenian school in Montreal, Quebec, Canada
Surp Hagop Church, Armenian Apostolic church in Aleppo, Syria
 Istanbul Agop Cymbals, manufacturing company of Turkey
Jacob (disambiguation)

References

Armenian masculine given names
Armenian-language surnames